The 2022–23 UEFA Europa League qualifying phase and play-off round began on 4 August and ended on 25 August 2022.

A total of 28 teams competed in the qualifying system of the 2022–23 UEFA Europa League, which included the qualifying phase, with 10 teams in Champions Path and six teams in Main Path, and the play-off round. The 10 winners in the play-off round advanced to the group stage, to join the 12 teams that enter in the group stage, the six losers of the Champions League play-off round (four from Champions Path and two from League Path), and the four League Path losers of the Champions League third qualifying round.

Times are CEST (UTC+2), as listed by UEFA (local times, if different, are in parentheses).

Teams
In the third qualifying round, the teams were divided into two paths:
Champions Path (10 teams): 10 teams which entered this round (10 losers of the Champions League Champions Path second qualifying round).
Main Path (4 teams): 4 teams which entered this round (including 2 losers of the Champions League League Path second qualifying round).

The winners of the third qualifying round were combined into a single path for the play-off round:
Play-off round (20 teams): 13 teams which entered this round (including 6 losers of the Champions League Champions Path third qualifying round), and 7 winners of the third qualifying round.

All teams eliminated from the qualifying phase and play-off round entered the Europa Conference League:
The 5 losers of the Champions Path third qualifying round entered the Champions Path play-off round.
The 2 losers of the Main Path third qualifying round entered the Main Path play-off round.
The 10 losers of the play-off round entered the group stage.

Below are the participating teams (with their 2022 UEFA club coefficients, not to be used as seeding for qualifying phase and play-off round, however), grouped by their starting rounds.

Notes

Format
Each tie was played over two legs, with each team playing one leg at home. The team that scored more goals on aggregate over the two legs advance to the next round. If the aggregate score was level at the end of normal time of the second leg, extra time was played, and if the same amount of goals were scored by both teams during extra time, the tie was decided by a penalty shoot-out.

Schedule
The schedule of the competition was as follows (all draws were held at the UEFA headquarters in Nyon, Switzerland).

Third qualifying round

The draw for the third qualifying round was held on 18 July 2022.

Seeding
A total of 14 teams played in the qualifying round. They were divided into two paths:
Champions Path (10 teams): 10 losers of the 2022–23 UEFA Champions League second qualifying round (Champions Path), whose identity was not known at the time of draw. There was no seeding.
Main Path (4 teams): The teams were seeded as follows:
Seeded: 2 teams which entered in this round.
Unseeded: 2 losers of the 2022–23 UEFA Champions League second qualifying round (League Path), whose identity was not known at the time of draw.
Teams from the same association could not be drawn against each other. The first team drawn in each tie was the home team of the first leg.

Summary

The first legs were played on 4 August, and the second legs were played on 9 and 11 August 2022. 

The winners of the ties advanced to the play-off round. The losers were transferred to the Europa Conference League play-off round of their respective path.

|+Champions Path

|}

|+Main Path

|}

Champions Path

Malmö FF won 5–2 on aggregate.

Shamrock Rovers won 5–2 on aggregate.

Zürich won 5–0 on aggregate.

3–3 on aggregate. Olympiacos won 4–3 on penalties.

HJK won 3–0 on aggregate.

Main Path

AEK Larnaca won 4–3 on aggregate.

Fenerbahçe won 4–1 on aggregate.

Play-off round

The draw for the play-off round was held on 2 August 2022.

Seeding
A total of 20 teams played in the play-off round. The teams were seeded into four "priority groups":
Priority 1: The 6 teams from the higher ranking association which entered in this round.
Priority 2: 6 losers of the 2022–23 UEFA Champions League third qualifying round (Champions Path), whose identity was not known at the time of the draw
Priority 3: 5 winners of the third qualifying round (Champions Path), whose identity was not known at the time of the draw
Priority 4: The remaining team which entered in this round, and 2 winners of the third qualifying round (Main Path), whose identity was not known at the time of the draw
The procedure of the draw was as follows:
 Three teams from Pot 1 (Priority 1) were paired with the three teams in Pot 4 (Priority 4).
 The three remaining Pot 1 (Priority 1) teams were then paired with teams from Pot 3 (Priority 3).
 The two remaining Pot 3 (Priority 3) teams were then paired with teams from Pot 2 (Priority 2).
 The four remaining Pot 2 (Priority 2) balls were then drawn one after another to complete the ninth and tenth pairings (open draw).
Country protection was not applied. The first team drawn in each tie was the home team of the first leg.

Summary

The first legs were played on 18 August, and the second legs were played on 25 August 2022. 

The winners of the ties advanced to the group stage. The losers were transferred to the Europa Conference League group stage.

|}

Matches

AEK Larnaca won 5–1 on aggregate.

Omonia won 4–0 on aggregate.

Fenerbahçe won 6–1 on aggregate.

Zürich won 3–1 on aggregate.

HJK won 2–1 on aggregate.

Malmö FF won 5–1 on aggregate.

Ferencváros won 4–1 on aggregate.

2–2 on aggregate. Olympiacos won 3–1 on penalties.

0–0 on aggregate. Sheriff Tiraspol won 3–2 on penalties.

Ludogorets Razgrad won 4–3 on aggregate.

Notes

References

External links

1
August 2022 sports events in Europe